Cicerone is an unincorporated community in Roane County, West Virginia, United States.

The name is derived from cicerone, a type of guide.

References 

Unincorporated communities in West Virginia
Unincorporated communities in Roane County, West Virginia